The 1978 Pacific Southwest Open, also known under its sponsorship name 1978 ARCO Open, was a men's tennis tournament played on indoor carpet courts at the Pauley Pavilion in Los Angeles, California in the United States. The event was part of the Grand Prix tennis circuit. It was the 52nd edition of the tournament and was held from September 18 through September 25, 1978. Seventh-seeded Arthur Ashe won the singles title as well as 200 ranking points.

Finals

Singles
 Arthur Ashe defeated  Brian Gottfried 6–2, 6–4

Doubles
 John Alexander /  Phil Dent defeated  Fred McNair /  Raúl Ramírez 7–6, 6–3

References

External links
 Official website
 ITF tournament edition details

Los Angeles Open (tennis)
Pacific Southwest Open
Pacific Southwest Open
Pacific Southwest Open
Pacific Southwest Open